The Book of Burial (Chinese: t , s , p Zàngshū) was a 4th or 5th-century AD work by the Taoist mystic Guo Pu. 

The work was a commentary on the now-lost Classic of Burial (t , s ); as it survived and transmitted the classic's teachings, the Book of Burial'''s principles relating the flow of qi to the appropriateness of a tomb's location were influential on the development of fengshui.

See also
 Green Satchel Classic''

References

External links
 "The Zangshu or Book of Burial ", trans. by Stephen Field
 Another translation by Zhang, Juwen

5th-century books
4th-century books
Chinese books of divination
Taoist texts